The 2019-20 Bentley Falcons men's ice hockey season was the 43rd season of play for the program, the 21st at the Division I level, and the 17th season in the Atlantic Hockey conference. The Falcons represented Bentley University and were coached by Ryan Soderquist, in his 18th season.

On March 12, 2020, Atlantic Hockey announced that the remainder of the conference tournament was cancelled due to the coronavirus pandemic.

Roster
As of September 12, 2019.

|}

Standings

Schedule and Results

|-
!colspan=12 style=";" | Regular Season

|-
!colspan=12 style=";" | 

|- align="center" bgcolor="#e0e0e0"
|colspan=12|Bentley Won Series 2–0
|- align="center" bgcolor="#e0e0e0"
|colspan=12|Remainder of Tournament Cancelled

Scoring Statistics

Goaltending statistics

Rankings

References

2019–20
Bentley Falcons
Bentley Falcons
2019 in sports in Massachusetts
2020 in sports in Massachusetts